Alvan Graham Clark (July 10, 1832 – June 9, 1897) was an American astronomer and telescope-maker.

Biography
Alvan Graham Clark was born in Fall River, Massachusetts, the son of Alvan Clark, founder of Alvan Clark & Sons.

On January 31, 1862, while testing a new  aperture great refractor telescope in Cambridgeport, Massachusetts, Clark made the first ever observation of a white dwarf star.  This discovery of Sirius B, or affectionately "the Pup", proved an earlier hypotheses (Friedrich Bessel in 1844) that Sirius, the brightest star in the night sky with an apparent magnitude of −1.46, had an unseen companion disturbing its motion.  Clark used the largest refracting telescope lens in existence at the time, and the largest telescope in the United States, to observe the magnitude 8 companion.

Clark's 18.5 inch refracting telescope was then delivered to his customer, the landmark Dearborn Observatory of Northwestern University in Evanston, Illinois, where it is still being used today.

Alvan Graham Clark died in Cambridge, Massachusetts on June 9, 1897.

See also
List of astronomical instrument makers

References

 
 The Dearborn Telescope
 Sirius A & B: A Double Star System In The Constellation Canis Major
 Northwestern University Astronomy and Astrophysics – History of Dearborn Observatory
 Look south to see winter's brightest constellations

External links
 Portraits of Alvan Graham Clark from the Lick Observatory Records Digital Archive, UC Santa Cruz Library's Digital Collections

1832 births
1897 deaths
American astronomers
People from Fall River, Massachusetts